Egypt made its Deaflympics debut in the 2013 Summer Deaflympics. Egypt claimed their first Deaflympic medal when they clinched the bronze medal for football in the 2017 Summer Deaflympics Egypt has never participated in the Winter Deaflympics.

Medal tallies

Summer Deaflympics

Medals at each sports events

See also 
Egypt at the Paralympics
Egypt at the Olympics

References

External links 
 2017 Deaflympics

Nations at the Deaflympics
Parasports in Egypt
Egypt at multi-sport events
Deaf culture in Egypt